In taxonomy, Thermoplasma is a genus of the Thermoplasmataceae.

Thermoplasma is a genus of archaea.  It belongs to the Thermoplasmata, which thrive in acidic and high-temperature environments.  Thermoplasma are facultative anaerobes and respire using sulfur and organic carbon.  They do not contain a cell wall but instead contain a unique membrane composed mainly of a tetraether lipoglycan containing atypical archaeal tetraether lipid attached to a glucose- and mannose-containing oligosaccharide.  This lipoglycan is presumably responsible for the acid and thermal stability of the Thermoplasma membrane.

See also
 List of Archaea genera

References

Further reading

Scientific journals

Scientific books

Scientific databases

External links

 Thermoplasma volcanium
 Thermoplasma acidophilum
 The genome sequence of the thermoacidophilic scavenger Thermoplasma acidophilum

Archaea genera
Euryarchaeota